Francisco Miranda (born 21 August 1941) is a Paraguayan footballer. He played in eight matches for the Paraguay national football team from 1966 to 1967. He was also part of Paraguay's squad for the 1967 South American Championship.

References

External links
 

1941 births
Living people
Paraguayan footballers
Paraguay international footballers
Association football midfielders
People from Caraguatay, Paraguay